Stojkovačka planina (Serbian Cyrillic: Стојковачка планина) is a mountain in southwestern Serbia, above the town of Ivanjica. Its highest peak has an elevation of 1,360 meters above sea level.

References

Mountains of Serbia